WHPT (102.5 FM, currently known as "102.5 The Bone") is a Cox Radio station located in the Sarasota, Tampa Bay, and St. Petersburg, Florida areas, but can be heard as far south as Fort Myers and Naples, from its transmitter near SR 70, near the northeastern corner of Sarasota County. While the station's license and transmitter (27° 24' 31" N, 82° 14' 59" W) is based within the Sarasota radio market, its studios are based in St. Petersburg with the other Cox stations, and focuses on the Tampa Bay radio market.

WHPT airs a hot talk format; its HD2 subchannel is branded "Strike 102.5 HD2", and carries a sports radio format.

History

WSAF / WQSR
The station signed on the air in 1960 as WYAK. In 1967, the callsign was changed to WSAF-FM.

In 1973, the Sarasota Radio Company purchased WSAF and changed its format to the beautiful music format and its callsign to WQSR. Its new call letters reflected company president, Edward Rogers', philosophy: QSR: Quality Stereo Radio.  After a somewhat schizophrenic existence for several years, playing Beautiful Music from 6 a.m. to 6 p.m., and Album Oriented Rock from 6 p.m. to 6 a.m., the station finally pulled the plug on the daytime format when ratings and advertising sales clearly indicated the community's preference for rock and roll .  During part of this period, the station added quadraphonic sound, and promoted itself as "Quad One-Oh-Two-And-A-Half". The free-form music format would eventually suffer challenges from other formats that eroded its Arbitron ratings in the critical 25-34 and 25-54 demographics.

WSRZ / WAVE
Cosmos Broadcasting (now Raycom Media) purchased WQSR, on Labor Day weekend in 1979, and changed its call letters to WSRZ.  In 1980, Cosmos brought in Dain L. Schult with Radioactivity, Inc. who acted initially as a consultant for the station, and instituted a Mainstream format at the station, which was a hybrid AOR/CHR approach, with specialty programming like Jazz on the side.  It was Schult's idea to come up with the new moniker for the station: The Music Wave.  The on-air personalities identified the station with "The Music Wave, one oh two and a half".  Schult eventually became the station's Program Director and afternoon on-air personality.

In order to have the call letters of the radio station more closely represent the format of the station, and because Cosmos already had the "WAVE" call letters because of their TV station in Louisville, Cosmos successfully petitioned the FCC to transition WSRZ to WAVE in March 1984. There was no significant change in format with the name change. The former WSRZ call letters were then moved to former CHR station in Sarasota in late 1986.

In 1988, Susquehanna Radio Corporation, part of conglomerate Susquehanna Pfaltzgraff purchased WAVE and changed the calls to WHVE. Initially the new ownership maintained the existing format, but with more emphasis on its already existing jazz programming.  Eventually the station began updating its sound with the introduction of a contemporary jazz playlist with artists like David Benoit, Anita Baker, The Rippingtons, Lee Ritenour, Larry Carlton, Grover Washington, Jr., David Sanborn, and Kenny G. For the last two years that Susquehanna owned the station, it maintained a Smooth Jazz format.

The Point
In 1991, "Bud" Lowell Paxson of Paxson Communications (now ION Media Networks) negotiated the sale of WHPT from Susquehanna Pfaltzgraff and, after publicity stunt that featured a week's worth of playing Led Zeppelin's Stairway to Heaven over and over again, changed the station's call letters from WHVE to WHPT, renamed the station to "The Point 102.5" and changed the format to Adult Album Alternative, or AAA.

Initially, The Point 102.5 followed a fairly conservative AAA path, combining adult-oriented artists like Bonnie Raitt, Dire Straits, Stevie Ray Vaughan, Steve Winwood, and Steely Dan. Later, taking cues from extensive music testing and a work that was presaging a new alternative sound, the station began mixing traditional favorites with more contemporary artists such as Red Hot Chili Peppers, The Cranberries, R.E.M., Spin Doctors and U2. The station also became known for its "New Music File" which featured new artists that were not receiving airplay on other stations, but were nonetheless consistent with the other music being played on the station.  Notable adds to the "New Music File" that first saw airplay on The Point that later went on much larger national acclaim were Soul Asylum, The Crash Test Dummies, 4 Non Blondes, Tori Amos, Chris Duarte, Counting Crows, and Edwin McCain.

The Bone
In 1997, WHPT was sold by Paxson Communications to Clear Channel Communications (now IHeartMedia). Due to ownership limits, Clear Channel sold the station to Cox in 2001. In 2002, WHPT flipped to classic rock and adopted the branding "102.5 The Bone." By September 2010, WHPT tweaked its classic rock format in a younger hard rock direction and added 2000–2004 titles plus most 1990s titles, although newer rock can still be heard on its sister station WSUN.

In April 2012, WHPT adjusted its format to hot talk, while keeping the "Bone" moniker.

In September 2022, it was announced that WHPT would be the new flagship station of the Tampa Bay Lightning of the National Hockey League. The station is also expected to reformat its HD2 subchannel that'll be centered on 24/7 Lightning-focused programming, including original live programming, game replays, podcasts, and more. WHPT is also became the flagship station of the South Florida Bulls football team as of 2022.

Formats

References

 440: Satisfaction
 WHVE - A History
 WQSR - A History
 Susquehanna Radio
 Tampa-St. Petersburg Radio Call Letter History
 Radio Evangelist

External links
 
 
 
 

HPT
Cox Media Group
Radio stations established in 1960
1960 establishments in Florida